The following is the discography of American jazz pianist and composer Thelonious Monk (1917–1982).

Discography

Blue Note Records (1947–1952) 

The recording sessions had been issued in various forms before 12 inch LP era of BLP-1500 series. And initial 12 inch LP versions still contained the six Blue Note recording sessions in non-chronological configurations. CD versions became to reflect the recording dates roughly in the following notes:
 BLP-1510 Genius of Modern Music: Volume 1 – 1947 Blue Note recording sessions
 BLP-1509 Milt Jackson – 1948, 1951 and 1952 Blue Note recording sessions
 BLP-1511 Genius of Modern Music: Volume 2 – 1951 and 1952 Blue Note recording sessions

Posthumous releases
 Live at the Five Spot Discovery! featuring John Coltrane (1993) – live recorded at the Five Spot Café in 1958
 Thelonious Monk Quartet with John Coltrane at Carnegie Hall with John Coltrane (2005) – live recorded at Carnegie Hall in 1957

Prestige Records (1952–1954) 
Original 10-inch LPs
Before their eventual formulation into three somewhat haphazard, non-chronological 12-inch LPs, Thelonious Monk's Prestige output consisted of five strictly chronological 10-inch (shorter-duration) LPs. The LPs were re-released by Craft Records in a limited edition in 2017. The LPs were released in the 1950s as follows:
Thelonious Monk Trio: Thelonious (Prestige PrLP 142) – recorded on October 15, 1952 (side A) and December 18, 1952 (side B)
Thelonious Monk Quintet Blows For LP, Featuring Sonny Rollins (Prestige PrLP 166) – recorded on November 13, 1953
Thelonious Monk Quintet (with Frank Foster, Art Blakey) (Prestige PrLP 180) – recorded on May 11, 1954
Thelonious Monk Plays (with Percy Heath and Art Blakey) (Prestige PrLP 189) – recorded on September 22, 1954
Sonny Rollins and Thelonious Monk (Prestige PrLP 190) – recorded on October 25, 1954,

The majority of the contents of the first 4 of these five LPs were released, sequenced mostly in order, on a Prestige double-LP compilation in 1972, PR/PRT 24006, Thelonious Monk. The exception was the take of "Think of One" selected; on the compilation, Take 1 was used instead of the originally-selected Take 2.

 Recompilations as 12-inch LP albums
 Thelonious Monk Trio (Prestige 7027, 1956) – recorded in 1952–54
 Monk (Prestige 7053, 1956) – recorded in 1953-54
 Thelonious Monk and Sonny Rollins (Prestige 7075, 1956) – recorded in 1953-54

Riverside Records (1955–1961) 
 Thelonious Monk Plays the Music of Duke Ellington (1956) – recorded in 1955
 The Unique Thelonious Monk (1956)
 Brilliant Corners (1957) – recorded in 1956
 Thelonious Himself (1957)
 Monk's Music (1957)
 Mulligan Meets Monk (1957) with Gerry Mulligan
 Thelonious in Action with Johnny Griffin (1958) – live at The Five Spot Café
 Misterioso (1958) – recorded on the same date with Thelonious in Action above
 The Thelonious Monk Orchestra at Town Hall (1959) – Charlie Rouse joined the band then
 5 by Monk by 5 (1959)
 Thelonious Alone in San Francisco (1959)
 Thelonious Monk at the Blackhawk with Charlie Rouse (1960)
 Thelonious Monk with John Coltrane (1961) – recorded in 1957. inducted into the Grammy Hall of Fame in 2007.
 Thelonious Monk in Italy (1963) – recorded in 1961
 Monk in France (1965) – live recorded in 1961
 The Complete 1957 Riverside Recordings (2006) – collection of the 1957 studio recordings with John Coltrane

Columbia Records (1962–1968) 
 Monk's Dream (1963) – recorded in 1962
 Criss-Cross (1963) – recorded in 1962-63
 Monk in Tokyo (1963)
 Miles & Monk at Newport (1964) – recorded in 1963, with unrelated 1958 Miles Davis performance
 Big Band and Quartet in Concert (1964) – live recorded in 1963
 It's Monk's Time (1964)
 Monk (1965) – recorded in 1964
 Solo Monk (1965) – recorded in 1964-65
 Misterioso (Recorded on Tour) (1965) – live
 Straight, No Chaser (1967) – recorded in 1966-67
 Underground (1968) – recorded in 1967-68
 Monk's Blues (1968)
 Live at the It Club (1982) – live recorded in 1964
 Live at the Jazz Workshop (1982) – live recorded in 1964

On other labels 
 1954: Piano Solo (Disques Vogue, 1954) - the first solo piano album, recorded in Paris on June 4, 1954
 1959: Les Liaisons Dangereuses 1960 (Sam, 2017) – recorded on July 27, 1959
 1961: Complete 1961 Amsterdam Concert  (Solar, 2014) – recorded on April 15, 1961
 1961: April in Paris (Milestone, 1981) – recorded on April 18, 1961
 1961: Live in Stockholm (Dragon, 1987) – recorded on May 16, 1961
 1963: Mønk (Gearbox, 2018) – recorded on March 5, 1963
 1963: The Thelonious Monk Quartet Monk in Tokyo (CBS/Sony, 1969) – live recorded in Tokyo on May 21, 1963
 1963: Live at Monterey Jazz Festival '63 (Storyville, 1994) – live recorded on September 21 & 22, 1963
 1964: Live in Paris, 1964 (France's Concert, 1989) – live recorded at Maison de la Radio on February 23, 1964
 1964: Live at the 1964 Monterey Jazz Festival (Monterey Jazz Festival Records, 2007) – live recorded on September 20, 1964
 1967: Thelonious Monk Nonet Live in Paris 1967 (France's Concert, 1988) – live recorded on November 3, 1967
 1968: Palo Alto (Impulse!, 2020) – live recorded at Palo Alto High School on October 27, 1968
 1969: Paris 1969 (Laser Swing Productions/Blue Note, 2013)[CD + DVD-Video] – live recorded at Salle Pleyel in Paris on December 15, 1969
 1971: The Man I Love (Black Lion, 1971) – recorded on November 15, 1971
 1971: Something in Blue (Black Lion, 1972) – recorded on November 15, 1971
 1971: Blue Sphere (Black Lion, ?) – recorded on November 15, 1971

As sideman 
With Art Blakey
 Art Blakey's Jazz Messengers with Thelonious Monk (Atlantic, 1958)
 The Giants of Jazz (Atlantic, 1971)

With Dave Brubeck
 Summitt Sessions (Columbia, 1970) – 1 track

With Miles Davis
 Bags' Groove (Prestige, 1954)
 Miles Davis and the Modern Jazz Giants (Prestige, 1954)

With Coleman Hawkins
Bean and the Boys (Prestige, 1972) – recorded in 1944. 4 tracks only.

With Milt Jackson
 Wizard of the Vibes (Blue Note, 1948) – a.k.a. Milt Jackson (Blue Note, 1956)

With Charlie Parker and Dizzy Gillespie
 Bird and Diz (Verve, 1950)

With Sonny Rollins
 Moving Out (Prestige, 1954)
 Sonny Rollins, Vol. 2 (Blue Note, 1957)

With Gigi Gryce
 Nica's Tempo  (Savoy, 1955)

With Clark Terry
 In Orbit (Riverside, 1958)

Compilations
 Monk's Miracles (1966)
 Monk's Greatest Hits (Columbia, 1968)
 The Best of Thelonious Monk (Riverside Records, 1969)
 Midnight at Minton's (c.1941, issued 1973 under Don Byas' name. Monk does not play on all tracks of this or the other two CDs of 1941 material)
 After Hours (c.1941, issued 1973 under Charlie Christian's name)
 After Hours in Harlem (c.1941, issued 1973 under Hot Lips Page's name)
 Monk's Classic Recordings (1983)
 Blues Five Spot (1984, unissued recordings from 1958 to 1961, with various saxophonists and Thad Jones, cornet)
The Complete Riverside Recordings of Thelonious Monk (1991, 15 CD, Riverside)
The Complete Blue Note Recordings of Thelonious Monk  (1994, 4 CD, Blue Note)
Monk Alone: The Complete Solo Studio Recordings of Thelonious Monk 1962–1968 (1998, 2 CD, Sony)
The Complete Prestige Recordings of Thelonious Monk (2000, 3 CD, Prestige)
The Columbia Years: '62–'68 (2001, 3 CD, Sony)
The Essential Thelonious Monk (2003, CD, Columbia/Legacy)
The Complete Vogue Recordings/The Black Lion Sessions (1954–71) (3LP, Mosaic)
All Monk. The Riverside Albums (2010, 16 CD, Universal)
The Thelonious Monk Quartet Complete Columbia Studio Albums Collection (2012, 6 CD, Sony)
The Thelonious Monk Complete Columbia Live Albums Collection (2015, 10 CD, Sony)

References

External links
Thelonious Monk's discography

Jazz discographies
Discography